KCDQ (95.3 FM) is a radio station broadcasting an adult contemporary format. It is licensed to Douglas, Arizona, United States. The station is currently owned by Cochise Broadcasting, LLC (a Wyoming LLC).

History
The station went on the air as KEAL on 1996-01-29.  on 2002-06-05, the station changed its call sign to the current KCDQ.

References

External links

CDQ